George v. Victor Talking Machine Co., 293 U.S. 377 (1934), was a United States Supreme Court case in which the Court held the district court's ruling of infringement of a song's common law copyright, granting an injunction so that damages could be determined, was interlocutory. The appeal came too late, so the Court vacated the appeal.

References

External links
 

1934 in United States case law
United States Supreme Court cases
United States Supreme Court cases of the Hughes Court
United States copyright case law